El Attaf District is a district of Aïn Defla Province, Algeria.

Municipalities
The district further divides into two municipalities.
El Attaf
Tiberkanine

Districts of Aïn Defla Province